Bashar Ahmad Nuseibeh, (born 1967) is a professor of computing at The Open University in the United Kingdom, a professor of software engineering at the University of Limerick in Ireland, and chief scientist of Lero, the Irish Software Research Centre. He is also an honorary professor at University College London (UCL) and the National Institute of Informatics (NII), Japan.

Career
Bashar received a BSc (First Class Honours) degree in computer systems engineering from the University of Sussex, UK, in 1988, before moving to Imperial College London to complete his MSc (1989) and PhD (1994) in software engineering. He remained at Imperial College as a postdoctoral researcher until receiving a lectureship in 1996 before being promoted to reader in 2000. In 2001 he moved to the Open University as professor of computing, where he was director of research from 2002 to 2008. From 2009 to 2012 he took a secondment to Lero, The Irish Software Research Centre, as professor of software engineering and chief scientist. He was a visiting professor at Imperial College, and is currently a visiting professor at both University College London (UCL) and the National Institute of Informatics (NII), Japan. He received two European Research Council (ERC) grants, including an Advanced Grant on Adaptive Security and Privacy.

Honors and fellowships
Member of the Royal Irish Academy (RIA).
Fellow of the British Computer Society (BCS).
Fellow of Irish Computer Society (ICS).
Fellow of the Institution of Engineering & Technology (IET).
Member of Academia Europaea.
Automated Software Engineering Fellow
Royal Society-Wolfson Merit Award.
Senior Research Fellow of the Royal Academy of Engineering.
Philip Leverhulme Prize.
Most Influential Paper Award at International Conference on Software Engineering (ICSE).
ACM SigSoft Distinguished Service Award
IFIP Outstanding Service Award

References

External links
Personal Webpage
Selected publications

1967 births
Living people
Alumni of the University of Sussex
British computer scientists
Academics of the Open University
Bashar Ahmad
Alumni of the Department of Computing, Imperial College London
Members of the Royal Irish Academy